A plot twist is a literary technique that introduces a radical change in the direction or expected outcome of the plot in a work of fiction.

Plot twist may also refer to:

Plot Twist (song), a song by Sigrid
"Plot Twist", a song by Marc E. Bassy